The Vardinoyiannia was an annual one-day outdoor track and field meeting at the Rethymno Municipal Sports Centre in Rethymno, Greece. First held in 1985, it was held in June or July each year until 2012, when the meeting folded due to financial reasons. It was part of the European Athletics permit meeting from 2000. It held permit meeting status on the IAAF World Athletics Tour from 2006 to 2009.

This record lasted for four years before Menéndez improved her own mark. The competition was the venue of Usain Bolt's competitive debut over the 100 metres in 2007.

References

External links
Official website (archived)

Defunct athletics competitions
Athletics competitions in Greece
Sport in Crete
Rethymno
IAAF Grand Prix
Recurring sporting events established in 1985
Recurring sporting events disestablished in 2012
1985 establishments in Greece
2012 disestablishments in Greece
Defunct sports competitions in Greece